Fog is a 1933 American pre-Code thriller film directed by Albert S. Rogell and produced and distributed by Columbia Pictures. It stars Mary Brian, Donald Cook and Reginald Denny.
The Library of Congress holds a print of the film.

Cast

References

External links
 
 

1933 films
Columbia Pictures films
Films directed by Albert S. Rogell
Films set on ships
American black-and-white films
1933 crime drama films
American crime drama films
1930s English-language films
1930s American films